Ed Lower (born 23 June 1987) is a former Australian rules football player in the Australian Football League, for the North Melbourne Football Club. He was a contestant on Big Brother Australia in 2013.

Ed Lower was a defensive player, regarded as medium-sized, who attacked the ball with speed and agility. He played as a defensive forward, shutting down the oppositions best rebounders, as a small defender and was also utilised as a run-with player through the midfield. He played for SANFL club Norwood in 2005. He was picked in the first round of the 2005 NAB AFL Rookie Draft at pick number 10 overall by the Kangaroos.

Lower attended Saint Ignatius' College, Adelaide before moving to Prince Alfred College with twin brother Nick Lower, who finished his AFL career with the Western Bulldogs. He was a contestant in Big Brother Australia 2013.

External links

http://www.bigbrother.com.au/housemates/ed/

1987 births
Living people
North Melbourne Football Club players
Norwood Football Club players
People educated at Prince Alfred College
Australian rules footballers from South Australia
Australian twins
Twin sportspeople
Big Brother (Australian TV series) contestants
North Ballarat Football Club players